Rockingham Centre is a regional shopping centre located  south-southwest of Perth, Western Australia, in the suburb of Rockingham. First opened in 1971 and formerly known as Rockingham City Shopping Centre, Rockingham Park Shopping Centre and Rockingham Shopping Centre, it has been redeveloped and expanded several times, and currently has a lettable floor area of  incorporating 184 tenants. The major stores include Woolworths, Coles, Kmart, Target, and Ace Cinemas.

The last major redevelopment was completed in 2009. In 2016, the centre expanded its external dining and entertainment precinct on Syren Street to include a number of restaurants and bars surrounding the cinemas.

The centre has 3,229 parking bays including around 300 undercover spaces, and lies between Council Avenue, Read Street, Chalgrove Avenue and Contest Parade.

References

External links

Shopping centres in Perth, Western Australia
Shopping malls established in 1971
Rockingham, Western Australia